The 2011–12 USC Spartans men's basketball team represented the University of South Carolina Upstate during the 2011–12 NCAA Division I men's basketball season. The Spartans, led by tenth year head coach Eddie Payne, played their home games at the G. B. Hodge Center and are members of the Atlantic Sun Conference.

For the first time, the Spartans were eligible for the Atlantic Sun Basketball tournament and NCAA postseason play, having completed their transition process to Division I.

They finished the season 21–13, 13–5 in A-Sun play to finish in a tie for second place. They lost in the quarterfinals of the Atlantic Sun Basketball Tournament to Florida Gulf Coast. They were invited to the 2012 CollegeInsider.com Tournament, their first ever Division I postseason appearance, where they defeated Kent State in the first round before falling to Old Dominion in the second round.

Roster

Schedule

|-
!colspan=9| Regular season

|-
!colspan=9| 2012 Atlantic Sun men's basketball tournament

|-
!colspan=9| 2012 CIT

References

USC Upstate Spartans men's basketball seasons
South Carolina Upstate
South Carolina Upstate
USC Upstate Spartans men's basketball
USC Upstate Spartans men's basketball